Rotan may refer to:

 Rotan, Texas, a city in Texas
 Ruslan Rotan, a professional Ukrainian footballer
 Rotan, the Malay word for rattan